4th Engineer Battalion may refer to:
4th Engineer Battalion (Belgium)
4th Engineer Brigade (Romania), now named 4th Engineer Battalion following reorganisation.
4th Engineer Battalion (United States)